Hebei is a town under the administration of Long County, Shaanxi, China. , it has eight villages under its administration:
Dongpo Village
Lanjiapu Village
Quanjiaxia Village
Qijiayuan Village
Xiliangwan Village
Baishi Village
Weijiapu Village
Miaopo Village

References 

Township-level divisions of Shaanxi
Long County, Shaanxi